The 10th Screen Actors Guild Awards, honoring the best achievements in film and television performances for the year 2003, were presented at the Shrine Exposition Center in Los Angeles, California on February 22, 2004. The nominees were announced on January 15, 2004 by Andie MacDowell and Mark Harmon at Los Angeles' Pacific Design Center's Silver Screen Theater.

Winners and nominees
Winners are listed first and highlighted in boldface.

Screen Actors Guild Life Achievement Award 
 Karl Malden

Film

Television

In Memoriam 
The awards remember his members who died since the previous year's ceremony:

 Katharine Hepburn
 Rand Brooks
 Les Tremayne
 Madlyn Rhue
 Earl Hindman
 Ellen Drew
 Gene Anthony Ray
 Wendy Hiller
 Dorothy Loudon
 Frederick Coffin
 Graham Jarvis
 Kellie Waymire
 Fred Rogers
 Bob Keeshan
 Janice Rule
 Art Carney
 Jonathan Brandis
 Suzy Parker
 Fred Berry
 Uta Hagen
 Jack Elam
 Julie Parrish
 Gordon Jump
 Jack Paar
 Florence Stanley
 William Marshall
 Anthony Caruso
 Donald O'Connor
 Larry Hovis
 Robert Stack
 Gisele MacKenzie
 Horst Buchholz
 Michael Jeter
 Buddy Ebsen
 Hope Lange
 Buddy Hackett
 Ann Miller
 Johnny Cash
 Charles Bronson
 Penny Singleton
 David Hemmings
 Martha Scott
 Alan Bates
 Lynne Thigpen
 Hume Cronyn
 Jeanne Crain
 John Ritter
 Gregory Hines
 Bob Hope
 Gregory Peck

References

External links
 The 10th Annual Screen Actors Guild Awards

2003
2003 film awards
2003 television awards
Screen
Screen Actors Guild
Screen
February 2004 events in the United States
2003 guild awards